Dasypsyllus cteniopus is a species of flea in the family Ceratophyllidae. It was described by Karl Jordan and Charles Rothschild in 1920.

References 

Ceratophyllidae
Insects described in 1920